The South African Railways Class 19A 4-8-2 of 1929 was a steam locomotive.

In 1929, the South African Railways placed 36 Class 19A steam locomotives with a 4-8-2 Mountain type wheel arrangement in service. Five of them were later reboilered and reclassified to Class 19AR.

Manufacturer
The Class 19A 4-8-2 Mountain type steam locomotive was a later modified version of the successful Class 19 which had been introduced a year earlier. Thirty-six Class 19A engines were delivered by Swiss Locomotive and Machine Works (SLM) of Winterthur in 1929, numbered in the range from 675 to 710.

Characteristics

Like the Class 19, the Class 19A also had Walschaerts valve gear and a bar frame.

The leading coupled wheels had flangeless tyres, but these were later flanged.

While the aim was to reduce the locomotive's total weight for use on some of the more lightly laid branch lines, the actual achieved weight saving was a mere four tons which could hardly have justified the cost of redesigning.

The trailing bissel truck was constructed with three holes to enable the compensating beam to be fitted at three locations which enabled it to be used to redistribute the engine's weight on the trailing axle. The axle load weights as listed for the Class 19A are with the trailing truck compensating beam pin in the leading of the three holes. The axle load weights as listed for the Class 19AR are with the trailing truck compensating beam pin in the centre hole.

Watson Standard boilers
From the 1930s, many serving locomotives were reboilered with a standard boiler type designed by then CME A.G. Watson as part of his standardisation policy. Such Watson Standard reboilered locomotives were reclassified by adding an "R" suffix to their classification.

Five Class 19A locomotives, numbers 678, 693, 696, 700 and 706, were reboilered with Watson Standard no. 1A boilers and designated Class 19AR. In the reboilering process, at least two of the Class 19AR locomotives, numbers 693 and 696, received domeless boilers from the first batch of Class 19D locomotives which were delivered new with domeless Watson Standard boilers.

The reboilered Class 19AR locomotives gained less than a ton in weight during the modification process. While most locomotive classes which were reboilered with Watson Standard boilers were simultaneously equipped with Watson cabs with slanted fronts, some of the Class 19AR locomotives retained their original cabs with vertical fronts.

On the reboilered Class 19AR there were three versions of cab, since no. 696 had a slanted cab from the running board up and the remains of the squared front cab from the running board down. Apart from the slanted front of the Watson cab, an obvious difference between an original and a Watson Standard reboilered locomotive is usually the cover of the multiple valve regulator which is located in the smokebox, the rectangular object visible just to the rear of the chimney on the reboilered locomotive.

Service

South African Railways
The Class 19A fleet initially served on all systems of the SAR, but were later based mainly at Mason's Mill, Estcourt and Glencoe in Natal, at East London, Queenstown and Burgersdorp in the Eastern Cape, at Cape Town in the Western Cape and a few in the Western Transvaal.

No. 700 was written off after an accident and by 1977 the rest were all withdrawn from Railways service. Numbers 685, 692 and 693 are known to still survive, no. 685 staged in the open at Queenstown in the Eastern Cape, no. 692 plinthed at Sterkstroom in the Eastern Cape and no. 693 staged at Millsite in Krugersdorp.

The number plate of no. 685, depicted alongside as it is displayed in the Outeniqua Transport Museum in George, is incorrectly inscribed "19AR" since that locomotive was retired without being reboilered with a Watson Standard boiler. The engine was photographed, still with its original boiler, as late as April 1970, fifteen years into electrification and dieselisation of the SAR and with steam traction already largely relegated to shunting and pickup work.

Similarly, the picture of the Class 19A rusting at Queenstown, shown below with the number 693 hand-painted on the cabside, is actually of Class 19A no. 685. It still has an as-delivered boiler while no. 693 was reboilered with a domeless Class 19D boiler. Both locomotives had been set aside by the Transnet Heritage Foundation for preservation, with no. 685 staged at Queenstown and no. 693 at Millsite in Krugersdorp, but each somehow had the other's number painted on their cabsides after their number plates were removed.

Industrial
After being retired from SAR service, several of these locomotives were sold into a second career in industrial service.
 Numbers 678 and 683 went to Tweefontein United Collieries. No. 678 later went to Witbank Consolidated Collieries.
 No. 679 went to Apex Mines at Greenside, later to the Fluor for Sasol plant and eventually to Dunn's.
 Numbers 684 and 691 went to Gledhow Sugar Mill where they were named "Umvoti" and "Blythedale" respectively. No. 684 later went to Umgala Colliery.
 Numbers 689 and 707 went to Platberg Colliery.
 No. 710 went to Butakon Limited, then to Southern Cross Steel Company in Middelburg, Transvaal, and eventually to Umgala Colliery at Utrecht in Natal.

Preservation

Illustration

References

1990
1990
1990
4-8-2 locomotives
2D1 locomotives
SLM locomotives
Cape gauge railway locomotives
Railway locomotives introduced in 1929
1929 in South Africa